Teenage Cocktail is a 2016 American thriller drama film, written and directed by John Carchietta and starring Nichole Sakura, Fabianne Therese, Michelle Borth, Pat Healy, A. J. Bowen and Joshua Leonard. The film had its world premiere at South by Southwest on March 12, 2016.

Premise
Two high school students Annie (Nichole Sakura) and Jules (Fabianne Therese), feeling confined by their small town and parents, fall in love with each other and plan to run away and try webcam modelling to make enough money to survive. At first the money comes rolling in, but the girls quickly learn that the consequences of their actions can blindside them.

Cast
 Nichole Sakura as Annie Fenton
 Fabianne Therese as Jules Rae
 Michelle Borth as Lynn Fenton
 Pat Healy as Frank
 A. J. Bowen as Joseph Damone
 Joshua Leonard as Tom Fenton
 Zak Henri as Scott
 Lou Wegner as Alex
 River Alexander as Nick Fenton
 Laura Corelli as Maria
 Issac Salzman as Eddie

Production
Nichole Sakura and Fabianne Therese did not audition for their roles in the film, instead they had meetings to discuss the script and characters with Carchietta who does not trust the cold read process of traditional casting calls.

Marketing
In March 2016, the first teaser and poster for the film were released on IndieWire and Entertainment Weekly, respectively.

Release
The film had its world premiere at South by Southwest on March 12, 2016. Shortly thereafter, Netflix acquired distribution rights to the film and set it for a January 15, 2017, release.

References

External links
 
 

2016 films
2016 independent films
2016 LGBT-related films
2016 thriller drama films
2010s female buddy films
2010s teen drama films
American buddy drama films
American female buddy films
American independent films
American teen drama films
American teen LGBT-related films
American thriller drama films
Films shot in Los Angeles
LGBT-related buddy films
LGBT-related thriller drama films
Teen thriller films
2010s English-language films
2010s American films